= 90th parallel =

90th parallel may refer to:

- 90th parallel north, the North Pole
- 90th parallel south, the South Pole
